Ali Alawi (born 3 October 1993 in Homs, Syria) is a Syrian footballer. He currently plays for Al Futowa, which competes in the Syrian Premier League the top division in Syria.  He is not to be confused with the theoretical chemist Ali Alavi.

References

External links
 Career stats at goalzz.com

1993 births
Living people
Syrian footballers
Association football defenders
Sportspeople from Homs
Syrian Premier League players